Dummrise     is a village development committee in the Himalayas of Taplejung District in the Province No. 1 of north-eastern Nepal. At the time of the 2011 Nepal census it had a population of 1,559 people living in 324 individual households. There were 729 males and 830 females at the time of census.

References

External links
UN map of the municipalities of Taplejung District

Populated places in Taplejung District